Gobra Chhara Nayarhat is a GP under Dinhata - II block of Cooch Behar district of West Bengal. There are 23 villages under the GP. There is a Gramin Hospital and several health centres in the GP. Nayarhat High School (H.S.) and Abutara High school (H.S.) are the two higher secondary schools situated in the GP.

The prodhan of the GP is Mr. Aswini Kumar Roy of village KARALA (KISHANGANJ).

Villages in Cooch Behar district